The 2010–11 Cypriot First Division was the 72nd season of the Cypriot top-level football league. It began on 27 August 2010 with the first matches of the first round and will end on 11 May 2011 with the last matches of the second round. The defending champions were Omonia. APOEL won the championship four matchweeks before the end of the season.

Competition modus
Fourteen teams participate in the competition. Eleven of them have also competed in the 2009–10 season while the remaining three teams were promoted from the Second Division.

Each team plays against every other team twice, once at home and once away, for a total of 26 matches. After these matches, the two teams with the worst records will be relegated to the Second Division. The remaining twelve teams will be divided into three groups of four teams each.

The teams ranked first through fourth will play for the championship and to participate in the European competitions. Teams ranked ninth through 12th will determine the third relegated club, while the remaining four teams will play a placement round. Every team plays twice against its group opponents. Regular season records are carried over without any modifications.

Teams
Nea Salamis Famagusta and APEP Pitsilia were relegated at the end of the first stage of the 2009–10 season after finishing in the bottom two places of the table. They were joined by Aris Limassol, who finished at the bottom of the second-phase Group C.

The relegated teams were replaced by 2009–10 Second Division champions Alki Larnaca, runners-up AEK Larnaca and third-placed team Olympiakos Nicosia.

Personnel and kits

Note: Flags indicate national team as has been defined under FIFA eligibility rules. Players and Managers may hold more than one non-FIFA nationality.

Managerial changes

First round

League table

Results

Second round

Group A

Table

Results

Group B

Table

Results

Group C

Table

Results

Season statistics

Top scorers
Including matches played on 14 May 2011; Source: Cyprus Football Association

Hat-tricks

See also
 2010–11 Cypriot Second Division
 2010–11 Cypriot Cup

References

Sources

External links

Cypriot First Division seasons
Cyprus
1